The Confederação Geral dos Trabalhadores (General Confederation of Workers, CGT) is the second-largest federation of labor unions in Brazil. Founded in 1986, the CGT is close to the centrist Party of the Brazilian Democratic Movement (PMDB).

References

External links
 Official web site

Trade unions in Brazil
International Trade Union Confederation
Brazil
1986 establishments in Brazil
Trade unions established in 1986
Organisations based in São Paulo